Robert Irving Miller is a United States Air Force lieutenant general who serves as the twenty-fourth Surgeon General of the United States Air Force and also serves as the Surgeon General of the United States Space Force. 

He previously served as the Director of Medical Operations of the United States Air Force and prior to that, as Commander of the Air Force Medical Operations Agency. On April 13, 2021, Miller was nominated to be the next Surgeon General of the United States Air Force and the United States Space Force. The nomination was confirmed by voice vote of the United States Senate on May 26, 2021, and he assumed the assignment on June 4, 2021.

Effective dates of promotions

References

|-

|-

|-

Year of birth missing (living people)
Living people
Place of birth missing (living people)
Washington & Jefferson College alumni
Uniformed Services University of the Health Sciences alumni
United States Air Force Medical Corps officers
American pediatricians
Air War College alumni
Isenberg School of Management alumni
University of Massachusetts Amherst alumni
Recipients of the Legion of Merit
United States Air Force generals
Recipients of the Defense Superior Service Medal
Recipients of the Air Force Distinguished Service Medal
Surgeons General of the United States Air Force